William George Moore (11 June 1868 – 6 November 1937) was an Australian art and drama critic.

Moore was born at Sandhurst (now Bendigo, Victoria), the son of Thompson Moore one time a member of the Victorian Legislative Assembly 
and his wife Emily, née Capper. 
William Moore was educated at Scotch College, Sandhurst, and, after spending a few years in business, went on the stage and acted in the United States and Great Britain. Returning to Melbourne in 1904 he joined the staff of The Herald as drama critic. In 1905 Moore published a small volume on art City Sketches, this was followed in 1906 by Studio Sketches: Glimpses of Melbourne Studio Life. In 1909 Moore was responsible for an organization to encourage the production of local plays with both literary and dramatic qualities. In 1909 and 1910 several short plays were produced, including The Woman Tamer and The Sacred Place by Louis Esson, The Burglar by Katharine S. Prichard, and Moore's The Tea-Room Girl (1910) and The Mysterious Moonlight (1912).

In 1912 Moore went to London and during World War I served with the British Army Service Corps. Following the war he worked on the press in Sydney for several years. In 1934 he published a conscientious and valuable work in two volumes, The Story of Australian Art. The origins of this was a small pamphlet, The Beginnings of Art in Victoria, which Moore had written in 1905, and the book was gradually built up from original sources over a long period of years. In 1937 with Tom Inglis Moore he edited a collection of Best Australian One-Act Plays, and contributed to it an introductory essay on "The Development of Australian Drama".

In 1923 Moore married Madame Hamelius, well known as a New Zealand and Australian poet under the name of Dora Wilcox (born Mary Theodora Joyce Wilcox in 1873). He died at Sydney on 6 November 1937 and was cremated. Mrs Moore survived him, and died in 1953.

References

1868 births
1937 deaths
Australian art critics
People from Bendigo